The 6th United Andhra Pradesh Legislative Assembly election was held in 1978. It was the sixth election. Indira Gandhi formed new party INC(I). Indian National Congress (I)  won 175 seats out of 294 seats. While, JP won 60 seats and Independent candidates won 15 seats.

Election results

Constituencies

Contestants 

 

Total contestants in fray: 1,548

Average contestants per constituency: 5

Minimum contestants  in a constituency:  2

Maximum contestants  in a constituency: 16 in 207 - Himayatnagar

Performance of women candidates vis-a-vis men candidates

Results

Elected members

References

Andhra Pradesh
State Assembly elections in Andhra Pradesh
1970s in Andhra Pradesh